Lord Russell is a form of address used for several different members of the English family of Russell, including:

Descendants of Dukes of Bedford 
The heir apparent, past or present, to the Earl or Duke of Bedford (the Baron Russell of Cheneys); the other sons of a Duke of Bedford are called Lord [Forename] Russell

Heirs apparent

Francis Russell, Lord Russell (died 1585), son of 2nd Earl, MP for Tavistock
William Russell, Lord Russell (1639–1683), son of 5th Earl, MP for Tavistock and Bedfordshire

Others

Bertrand Russell (1872–1970), philosopher, mathematician, social critic, and pacifist
John Russell, 1st Earl Russell (1792–1878), British Prime Minister
Lord George Russell (1790–1846), British soldier, politician and diplomat
Lord Odo Russell (1829–1884),  British diplomat
Lord William Russell (1767–1840), MP for Surrey and Tavistock
Lord Arthur Russell (1825–1892), MP for Tavistock

Other people 
The name may also refer to:

Albert Russell, Lord Russell (1884–1975), MP for Kirkcaldy

Other uses 
Earl Russell
Baron Russell of Killowen
Baron Russell of Liverpool
Baron Russell of Thornhaugh
Lord Russell-Johnston
Baron Ampthill, the title granted to Lord Odo Russell

See also 
 Russell (disambiguation)
 Lady Russell